Arthur John Michael "Mackker" McCabe (23 June 1887 – 30 July 1924) was an Australian rugby union and pioneer professional rugby league footballer. He represented for Australian in rugby union at the 1908 Summer Olympics.

Rugby union career
 A brilliant fly-half, Mackker McCabe was a member of the Australian rugby union team which won the gold medal with McCabe scoring two tries in the gold medal victory.

While he toured the US and England with the Wallabies in the lead-up tour prior to the Olympics his gold medal match was his sole Australian representative appearance.

Rugby league career
On his return to Australia he joined the fledgling code of rugby league along with 13 of his Olympic teammates. He played for five seasons with the South Sydney Rabbitohs finishing his career with a premiership win in 1914. Despite representing for New South Wales in rugby league in 1910 he was unsuccessful in his bid to become a dual-code rugby international.

For the season 1910, he was the NSW Rugby Football League's top try scorer. He was so highly praised by the press, they dubbed him  The Will-O'-The-Wisp, a phrase that became synonymous with McCabe.

Death
Arthur McCabe died suddenly of a heart attack at his home in Morehead Street, Redfern on 30 July 1924, age 37. A large funeral was held for 'Mackker' McCabe and was attended by many ex Wallaby players and South Sydney players. He was buried at Rookwood Cemetery on 31 July 1924.

See also
 Rugby union at the 1908 Summer Olympics

Footnotes

References
 Andrews, Malcolm (2006) The ABC of Rugby League, Austn Broadcasting Corpn, Sydney

External links

1887 births
1925 deaths
Australia international rugby union players
Australian rugby league players
Australian rugby union players
Footballers who switched code
Olympic gold medalists for Australasia
Olympic rugby union players of Australasia
Rugby union players at the 1908 Summer Olympics
South Sydney Rabbitohs players
Medalists at the 1908 Summer Olympics
Rugby league players from New South Wales
Rugby union players from New South Wales
Rugby union fly-halves
South Sydney Rabbitohs captains